Guillermo "Mito" Pereira Hinke (born 31 March 1995) is a Chilean professional golfer who plays in the LIV Golf League.

Amateur career
Pereira was runner-up at the 2006 Optimist International Junior Golf Championship (boys 10-11 division), and won the 2008 Optimist International Junior Golf Championship (boys 12-13 division). He was runner-up at the 2010 Junior Open Championship at Lundin Golf Club in Fife, Scotland.

In 2013, at the age of 17, he won the Chilean Professional Tour's Abierto Internacional de Las Brisas de Chicureo, shooting 70-70-70 to win by one stroke over professionals Nico Geyger and Cristián León.

Pereira attended Texas Tech University in Lubbock and played one year of college golf with the Red Raiders in 2014–15; he reached No. 5 on the World Amateur Golf Ranking in August 2015 before deciding to turn pro.

Professional career
Pereira turned professional in the second half of 2015 and joined the 2016 PGA Tour Latinoamérica, where he won the Roberto De Vicenzo Punta del Este Open Copa NEC and managed to reach the top-spot of the Order of Merit, to become the youngest player ever ranked No. 1. In addition to his victory, he had two runner-up finishes and four further top-10s in 18 starts and ended the season ranked No. 3 on the Order of Merit, earning promotion to the 2017 Web.com Tour where his best finish was T3 at the Nashville Golf Open.

At the 2019 U.S. Open, he qualified for his first major, but did not make the cut. At the 2019 Pan American Games, Pereira won the bronze medal in the men's individual competition.

On the 2020–21 Korn Ferry Tour, he won the Country Club de Bogotá Championship in February 2020. With back to back victories at the Rex Hospital Open and BMW Charity Pro-Am in June 2021, he earned an instant promotion to the PGA Tour. He became just the 12th player in the developmental tour's 32-year history to earn the automatic three-win promotion, and the first since Wesley Bryan in 2016. In August 2021, Pereira finished in a tie for 3rd place at the Olympic Games. He lost in a 7-man playoff for the bronze medal.

At the 2022 PGA Championship, he entered the final round with a three-shot lead over Will Zalatoris and Matt Fitzpatrick, at 9-under-par. However, he struggled throughout the day, and reached the par-4 18th hole at Southern Hills at 6-under, with a one stroke lead over Zalatoris and Justin Thomas. Having missed his birdie putt at 17 by mere inches, he was aggressive off the tee, ultimately finding the right hand side creek, leading to a double bogey. He ended up tied for third place, as Thomas defeated Zalatoris in a playoff. Pereira was the third player over the previous 20 years to double-bogey the 72nd hole in a major and finish one shot out of a playoff; Phil Mickelson and Colin Montgomerie both did it at the 2006 U.S. Open.

Pereira qualified for the International team at the 2022 Presidents Cup; he played three matches, tying one and losing two.

In February 2023, it was announced that Pereira joined LIV Golf and will participate as a team member of Torque GC, alongside team captain and fellow Chilean Joaquin Niemann.

Personal life
Pereira appears in the sports documentary series Full Swing, which premiered on Netflix on February 15, 2023.

Amateur wins
2008 Optimist International Junior Golf Championship
2013 Golden Cup, Abierto Las Brisas de Santo Domingo, Abierto Las Araucarias, Los Leones Amateur, Campeonato de Chile Match Play, Abierto Las Brisas De Chicureo
2014 Abierto de Marbella, Abierto de Granadilla, Abierto Las Brisas de Santo Domingo, Abierto La Posada, Campeonato Internacional de Aficionados Copa Carlos Raffo, Los Leones Amateur, Campeonato de Aficionados de Chile - Match Play

Source:

Professional wins (10)

Korn Ferry Tour wins (3)

Korn Ferry Tour playoff record (1–1)

PGA Tour Latinoamérica wins (1)

TPG Tour wins (1)

PGA Tour Latinoamérica Developmental Series wins (1)

Chilean wins (4)
2013 (1) Abierto Internacional de Las Brisas de Chicureo (as an amateur)
2015 (2) Abierto de Marina Golf Rapel, Abierto del Club de Polo
2016 (1) Abierto de Cachagua

Playoff record
Other playoff record (0–1)

Results in major championships
Results not in chronological order in 2020.

CUT = missed the half-way cut
"T" indicates a tie for a place
NT = No tournament due to COVID-19 pandemic

Results in The Players Championship

CUT = missed the halfway cut

Team appearances
Amateur
Eisenhower Trophy (representing Chile): 2014

Source:

Professional
Presidents Cup (representing the International team): 2022

See also
2021 Korn Ferry Tour Finals graduates
List of golfers to achieve a three-win promotion from the Korn Ferry Tour

References

External links

Chilean male golfers
PGA Tour golfers
Olympic golfers of Chile
Golfers at the 2020 Summer Olympics
Texas Tech Red Raiders men's golfers
Pan American Games medalists in golf
Pan American Games bronze medalists for Chile
Golfers at the 2019 Pan American Games
Medalists at the 2019 Pan American Games
Sportspeople from Santiago
1995 births
Living people
21st-century Chilean people
PGA Tour Latinoamérica golfers
Korn Ferry Tour graduates
LIV Golf players